The Dalian Women's Tennis Open was a tournament for professional female tennis players played on outdoor hardcourts. It was classified as a WTA 125 tournament which was first held in Dalian, China, in 2015.

Past finals

Singles

Doubles

External links
 Dalian Women's Tennis Open at wtatennis.com

 
WTA 125 tournaments
Hard court tennis tournaments
Tennis tournaments in China